Good-By Girls! or Goodbye Girls is a 1923 American silent comedy mystery film directed by Jerome Storm and starring William Russell, Carmel Myers and Tom Wilson.

Plot
While staying at a country house, author Vance McPhee gets drawn in a series of adventures concerning a strongbox.

Cast
 William Russell as Vance McPhee 
 Carmel Myers as Florence Brown 
 Tom Wilson as Jordan 
 Kate Price as Sarah 
 Robert Klein as Batista

References

Bibliography
 Solomon, Aubrey. The Fox Film Corporation, 1915-1935: A History and Filmography. McFarland, 2011.

External links

1923 films
1920s comedy mystery films
American comedy mystery films
Films directed by Jerome Storm
American silent feature films
American black-and-white films
Fox Film films
1923 comedy films
Films with screenplays by Joseph F. Poland
Films about writers
Films set in country houses
1920s English-language films
1920s American films
Silent American comedy films
Silent comedy mystery films